St. Bridget's Convent is a private girls' school in Colombo, Sri Lanka. It was founded on 1 February 1902 by the Sisters of the Good Shepherd order, making it one of the earliest Irish mission schools of the Roman Catholic Church in Ceylon. 

The school today consists of a Montessori school, a primary school and a collegiate school. The school is a fee levying school. School buildings includes an auditorium.

History 
 
On 1 February 1902, at the request of T. A. Melizan, Archbishop of Colombo, St. Bridget's Convent was established as the second house of the Good Shepherd congregation for the education of young ladies. It was the third school in the Colombo area opened by the nuns. The first classes were held at a rented house on Turret Road (Colpetty) called 'The Firs' before moving to the current location, the premises of the former Henley House, Horton Place in 1912. Two sisters, Mary of St. Francis Borgia and Mary of Our lady of Lourdes, came from the original Kotahena Convent school (Good Shepherd Convent) to undertake this work.

Symbols 
The Irish origins of the Good Shepherd sisters are seen in the school colours, emblem and unique traditions.

Emblem
The school emblem depicts in essence the heart of the school. The rationale for its functioning and for its role within and without is reflected in the school motto ‘Gently and Firmly’. The other symbols include: 
 Fountain: symbolises fountain of learning 
 Dark green leaves and shamrock: the sisters' resilience and Irish origins 
 Shepherd's Crook: refers to the Good Shepherd sisters and God as the Good Shepherd who looks after his fold and guides them safely across the path

Patron saint
The patron saint of the school is St. Bridget, the patron saint of Ireland, whose feast is commemorated in the 1st of February of each year.

Houses 
There are 4 houses in the primary school and the collegiate school:
Borgia House  - motto "Charity to All, Malice to None"
Coudert House - motto "Fidelity to Duty is the Path to Glory"
Griaux House  - motto "Onwards and Upwards"
Melizan House - motto "United We Stand, Divided We Fall"

The houses are named for Dr. T. A. Melizan, Mother St. Francis Borgia, Father G. Griaux and Dr. A. Coudert, who were involved in the development of the school from the start.

Notable alumni

References

External links
Official website
St Bridget's convent primary school Web Site

1902 establishments in Ceylon
Catholic schools in Sri Lanka
Educational institutions established in 1902
Girls' schools in Sri Lanka
Private schools in Sri Lanka
Schools in Colombo
Schools in Sri Lanka founded by missionaries